Anatomy Is Destiny is the third full-length album by American death metal band Exhumed. The album is regarded as Exhumed's "most critically acclaimed" album. The title of the album is taken from a quote by Sigmund Freud. The only album to feature Bud Burke on bass before switching to guitar on Necrocracy. The last album to feature guitarist Mike Beams and drummer Col Jones.

Track listing
All songs written by Matt Harvey, except where noted.

Personnel
Matt Harvey – guitars, vocals
Mike Beams – guitars, vocals
Bud Burke – bass
Col Jones – drums
Sakara Birdong – additional vocals

Production
Neil Kernon – production, engineering, mixing
Scott Hull – mastering

References

Exhumed (band) albums
2003 albums
Relapse Records albums
Albums produced by Neil Kernon